Leslie Horace Hughes (18 April 1884 – 27 September 1962) was an Australian rules footballer who played for Collingwood in the Victorian Football League (VFL).

References

External links

1884 births
Collingwood Football Club players
Collingwood Football Club Premiership players
1962 deaths
Australian rules footballers from Melbourne
Three-time VFL/AFL Premiership players
People from Northcote, Victoria